NGC 1662 (also known as Collinder 55) is a loosely bound open cluster located in the constellation Orion. It has an apparent magnitude of 7.6 and an approximate size of 20 arc-minutes.

Location

NGC 1662 lies 1.7º NE of the star Pi1 Orionis.

References

External links
CCD image of NGC 1662, Velimir Popov & Emil Ivanov, 2018

Open clusters
1662
Orion (constellation)